Graham Marshall (born 23 May 1960) is a former Scotland international rugby union player. His regular playing position was Flanker and Number 8.

Rugby Union career

Amateur career

Marshall played club rugby for Wakefield and Selkirk.

Provincial career

Marshall played for the Scottish Exiles in the Scottish Inter-District Championship.

International career

Marshall received two Scotland 'B' caps in the 1987–88 season.

Marshall received two Scotland 'A' caps from 1991 to 1992.

Marshall won four senior full caps for Scotland between 1988 and 1991.

Coaching career

Marshall coached Selkirk High School and Selkirk Youth club. During his time at Selkirk Youth Club he took the team to three successive Youth League Cup finals, winning the title in 2003. Selkirk's promotion to the Scottish Premiership One in 2008 was 
described as a testament to Graham's coaching abilities, as 15 of his protégés were involved in the squad.

In 2011, Marshall became the coach at Scottish Permier One side, Heriot's Rugby Club in Edinburgh.  Graham has also coached the U18 Scottish team.

References

Sources

 Wakefield Rugby Football Club—1901-2001 A Centenary History. Written and compiled by David Ingall in 2001.

1960 births
Living people
Scottish rugby union players
Wakefield RFC players
Scotland international rugby union players
Scotland 'B' international rugby union players
Scotland 'A' international rugby union players
Rugby union players from Glasgow
Rugby union flankers
Rugby union number eights